Baba Lal Das was a Hindu priest of the idols of the deity Rama placed within the Babri Masjid complex in Ayodhya. He was appointed to his position by the Lucknow High Court in 1981. Lal Das was a vocal opponent of the agitation by the Vishva Hindu Parishad and its Hindu nationalist allies to build a temple at the site, and criticized it in the 1992 documentary Ram ke Naam. Lal Das was removed from his position by the Uttar Pradesh government led by the Bharatiya Janata Party (BJP) in March 1992. Shortly afterward, in December 1992, the Babri Masjid was demolished: Lal Das became a key witness in the suit brought against leaders of the Vishwa Hindu Parishad and the BJP by the Central Bureau of Investigation (CBI). On 16 November 1993, Lal Das was shot dead in the middle of the night in Ranipur Chattar village, 20 km from Ayodhya. The CBI took over the investigation of the case in 1994 and charged two people for murder over a land dispute. At the time of his death, a case he had brought to the High Court challenging his dismissal had yet to be resolved. Lal Das was seen as a promoter of religious harmony between Hindus and Muslims in the region.

References

Ayodhya dispute
1993 deaths
Communist Party of India (Marxist) politicians
People from Ayodhya